The Horn or Horn Davis or  Overholtzer Bridge  was a historic wooden covered bridge located in Morgan Township in Greene County and West Bethlehem Township in Washington County, Pennsylvania. It crossed Ten Mile Creek. As of October 1978, it was one of nine historic covered bridges in Greene County.

It was listed on the National Register of Historic Places in 1979.  It is designated as a historic bridge by the Washington County History & Landmarks Foundation. The bridge collapsed in March 1994, and has not been replaced or rebuilt.

References

Covered bridges on the National Register of Historic Places in Pennsylvania
Covered bridges in Greene County, Pennsylvania
Covered bridges in Washington County, Pennsylvania
Bridges completed in 1889
Bridges in Greene County, Pennsylvania
Tourist attractions in Greene County, Pennsylvania
National Register of Historic Places in Greene County, Pennsylvania
Road bridges on the National Register of Historic Places in Pennsylvania
Wooden bridges in Pennsylvania
Burr Truss bridges in the United States